Vladimir Karpovich Kotlinsky (– ) was a Russian Second Lieutenant and war hero during World War I. He was known for being the main commander during the famous Attack of the Dead Men as he led the counterattack of 60 to 100 men from the  before being mortally wounded during the battle. He was posthumously awarded the 4th Class of the Order of St. George for his services in the battle.

Childhood

Kotlinsky was born on August 3, 1894, at Ostrov. His father was a peasant from Verkaly, Minsk. He also had a younger brother named Yevgeni (1898-1968). In 1905, he entered the Pskov Realschule and his third grade report card showed that Kotlinsky took interest in natural science and art with his lowest grades being Russian, German and French.

Military career
In the summer of 1914, after his first year of service as a junker, they underwent standard geodetic practice near Rezhitsa in the Vitebsk Governorate.

On August 1, 1914, the day Germany declared war on Russia, is considered the first day of World War I. A month later, the school held an early graduation of junkers with distribution in parts. Vladimir Kotlinsky was assigned the rank of second lieutenant of the Corps of Military Topographers of the Russian Imperial Army with secondment to the 226th Zemlyansky infantry Regiment, which later became part of the garrison of the Osowiec Fortress. Despite this, not much is known about Kotlinsky's career prior to his service at the Attack of the Dead but the article The Feat of Pskov describes him as:

On September 26, 1916, he was posthumously awarded the Order of St. George, fourth Class for his bravery during the attack:

Legacy
On August 6, 2015, the "Monument to Compatriot Soldiers of the First World War" was opened in Pskov and Kotlinsky was featured within the monument as it "reflects the features of Vladimir Kotlinsky, a native of Pskov". A street in Pskov was named after Kotlinsky by the Pskov City Council on March 30, 2019.

Awards
Order of Saint Anna, 3rd and 4th Classes
Order of St. George, 4th Class
Order of Saint Stanislaus, 3rd Class with swords and bow

References

Further reading

1894 births
1915 deaths
People from Pskov Governorate
Russian military personnel of World War I
Russian military personnel killed in World War I
Recipients of the Order of St. Anna, 3rd class
Recipients of the Order of St. Anna, 4th class
Recipients of the Order of St. George of the Fourth Degree
Recipients of the Order of Saint Stanislaus (Russian), 3rd class